Everybody Dies is the sixth official studio album by Dramarama. It was released on October 25, 2005 (see 2005 in music). It also marks their first album of new material in 12 years since Hi-Fi Sci-Fi. The group was disbanded during that time.

Critical reception
Seattle Weekly wrote: "Dramarama speak punky mainstream rock as a language rather than deferring to it as a rule book; Easdale sings the over-40 blues without succumbing to coulda-been bitterness."

Track listing
All songs written by John Easdale, except for where noted.
"The Bottle and the Bell" – 2:58
 "Everybody Dies" – 3:12
 "Good Night, America" – 3:43
 "When Did You Leave Heaven?" (Walter Bullock & Richard A. Whiting) – 1:23
 "Physical Poetry (A-B-C-D-1-2-3)" – 3:20
 "I Will Try" – 0:55
 "Try 5 Times" – 2:12
 "Dropping the Curtains" – 5:03
 "The Company" (John Easdale/Mark Englert) – 2:49 
 "Gotta Get Up" – 4:26
 "King for a Day" – 3:26

References

Dramarama albums
2005 albums
33rd Street Records albums